Midlands Innovation is a group of eight universities in the Midlands of England. It was formed (as M5) in August 2012 by the universities of Birmingham, Leicester, Loughborough, Nottingham and Warwick in order to boost equipment sharing between member institutions, following the success of the N8 Research Partnership. In December 2012 the group, which had added Aston University, launched its online equipment sharing database. In March 2015, Chancellor George Osborne announced that the Midlands Innovation universities would lead the £60 million Energy Research Accelerator project. The project was re-announced in April 2016 as a £180 million project comprising the £60 million previously announced from the UK government and £120 million from the private sector. The consortium was re-launched as Midlands Innovation in May 2016.

See also
N8 Research Partnership
Science and Engineering South
GW4 Alliance

References

Aston University
College and university associations and consortia in the United Kingdom
Innovation in the United Kingdom
Loughborough University
Organizations established in 2012
University of Birmingham
University of Leicester
University of Nottingham
University of Warwick
2012 establishments in England
Universities in the West Midlands (county)